Martin Richard Scott (January 9, 1898 – February 10, 1979)  was appointed the 20th Fire Commissioner of the City of New York by Mayor Robert F. Wagner on August 6, 1964, and served in that position until the end of the Wagner Administration on December 31, 1965.  The FDNY has named a medal for Outstanding Courage in his honor.

Biography
Scott was appointed Fire Commissioner having served in all the Fire Marshal's ranks in the FDNY, rising to the top as Chief Fire Marshal prior to his commissioner's appointment. Scott was never a firefighter, but was one of the original non-uniformed Fire Marshals. He died on February 10, 1979, in Edison, New Jersey.

References

Commissioners of the New York City Fire Department
People from Edison, New Jersey
1898 births
1979 deaths